Mount Koven is a  mountain in the Alaska Range, in Denali National Park and Preserve. Mount Eldridge lies to the northeast of Denali on Karstens Ridge, with Mount Carpe to the northeast on the Carpe Ridge extension of Denali's northeast buttress. Mount Koven overlooks the Great Icefall of Muldrow Glacier, with the west fork of Traleika Glacier to the east. It was named for Theodore G. Koven, who, while trying to rescue Allen Carpé (for whom Mount Carpe is named) from a crevasse in Muldrow Glacier, fell into the same crevasse and was killed while on the Rockefeller Cosmic Ray Expedition in May 1932.

See also
Mountain peaks of Alaska

References

Alaska Range
Mountains of Denali Borough, Alaska
Denali National Park and Preserve
Mountains of Alaska